Judith Zsuzsanna Cornélie Maria Tielen (born 2 April 1972 in Arnhem) is a Dutch politician, serving in the House of Representatives of the Netherlands for the People's Party for Freedom and Democracy (Volkspartij voor Vrijheid en Democratie) since 31 October 2017. Between 2014 and 2017, she served on the Utrecht City Council.

References

1972 births
Living people
21st-century Dutch politicians
21st-century Dutch women politicians
Members of the House of Representatives (Netherlands)
Municipal councillors of Utrecht (city)
People from Arnhem
People's Party for Freedom and Democracy politicians
20th-century Dutch women